Pardon Us are a three-piece DIY punk band from Liverpool, formed in 2014. Following a split EP with Only Strangers on Keith Records, and a self-titled EP, their debut album Wait was released in July 2019.  Their second album Seamless was released in August 2020. They are characterised by fast-paced live performances and gang vocals.

The band's members have previously played in Liverpool-based acts Flamingo 50, Down and Outs, The No Marks and Town Bike, and have cited Hüsker Dü, Snuff, Naked Raygun and J Church as major influences.

Members
Morgan Brown - guitar, vocals
Gabby Santos - drums, vocals
Alex Howard - bass, vocals

Discography

Albums
'Wait' - Everything Sucks Music (UK), Johann's Face Records (US), Fixing a Hole (Japan) LP/CD/Mp3 (2019)
'Seamless' - Everything Sucks Music (UK), Fixing a Hole (Japan) LP/CD/Mp3 (2020)

EPs
"Pardon Us" - Everything Sucks Music, 7"/Mp3 (2017)

Splits
"Pardon Us // Only Strangers split" - Keith Records, CD (2015)

References

External links
Pardon Us Bandcamp
Everything Sucks Music Bandcamp
Johann's Face Records Bandcamp
Keith Records Bandcamp
Fixing a Hole website

English pop punk groups
Musical groups from Liverpool
Musical groups established in 2014
British musical trios
English punk rock groups
2014 establishments in England